Holland-class submarine No 4 was built by Vickers, at Barrow in Furness, Cumbria, United Kingdom, and was laid down in 1902. She was launched on 23 May 1902, and successfully concluded deep sea trials in the Irish Sea in August 1902. She was commissioned into the Royal Navy on 2 August 1903. In 1905 the submarine was fitted with a conning tower. She was the only member of the Holland-class to be given this modification. She was stricken in 1912. She foundered on 3 September 1912. She was salvaged and used as a gunnery target on 17 October 1914.

Service history

References

External links
 HMS Holland 4 page at MaritimeQuest

Holland-class submarines
Ships built in Barrow-in-Furness
1902 ships
Maritime incidents in 1912
Maritime incidents in October 1914
Ships sunk as targets
Lost submarines of the United Kingdom